Sewram Gobin (born January 19, 1983) is a Mauritian footballer who currently plays for AS Rivière du Rempart in the Mauritian League.

Club career
Gobin started off his professional career in 2003 with US Bassin Beau/Rose Hill of the Mauritian League. In 2005, he transferred to Savanne SC, also of the Mauritian league. In 2007, after a trial with Mohun Bagan AC of the I-League, he signed with the Indian giants, becoming the team's first Player of Indian Origin (PIO).

Gobin had expressed interest in playing in his ancestral homeland, India. In early 2009, he signed with Pune FC, who at that time was competing in the I-League 2nd Division. He was released later that year. In January 2011, after undergoing a trial back in Mauritius with his former club Savanne SC, Gobin signed with fellow competitor AS Rivière du Rempart.

International career
Gobin earned 2 caps for the national team in 2006. In 2009, he played for Mauritius in a friendly match against Egypt.

Personal life
Gobin's father Ganesh is a former footballer. He has three brothers, Jayram, Kabiraj and Sailesh, all of whom played football in Mauritius.

References

External links

1983 births
Living people
Mauritian footballers
Mauritius international footballers
Mauritian expatriate footballers
Mauritian expatriate sportspeople in India
Expatriate footballers in India
Mauritian Premier League players
Savanne SC players
Association football forwards
AS Rivière du Rempart players
I-League players